The Hospitals for the Poor Act 1572 (14 Eliz 1 c 14) was an Act of the Parliament of England.

The whole Act was repealed by section 39(1) of, and Schedule 5 to, the Charities Act 1960.

References
Halsbury's Statutes,

Acts of the Parliament of England (1485–1603)
1572 in law
1572 in England